Teliapsocus is a genus of shaggy psocids in the family Dasydemellidae. There are at least two described species in Teliapsocus.

Species
These two species belong to the genus Teliapsocus:
 Teliapsocus conterminus (Walsh, 1863)
 Teliapsocus distinctus Badonnel, 1986

References

External links

 

Caeciliusetae
Articles created by Qbugbot